Joseph Reuben Sellwood (24 January 1911 – 18 October 2007) was a New Zealand born Australian rules football player, playing 181 games (180 club, 1 representative) from 1930–1945.

Family
The son of Reuben and Jane Sellwood, Joseph Reuben Sellwood was born at Mataura, New Zealand on 24 January 1911.

Football
Sellwood, recruited from Goulburn Valley Football Association club Wunghu, made his senior debut for Geelong in the 1930 VFL season and was a member of their 1937 premiership team.

Prior to his death in 2007, Sellwood was recognised as the oldest VFL/AFL premiership player and was given honorary induction into the AFL 200 Club, because his career allegedly suffered significant interruption during World War II, preventing him from reaching 200 games.

Death
Sellwood died on 18 October 2007 at a nursing home in Belmont, Victoria. He was survived by his four daughters Lesley, Margaret, Joan and Judith, 18 grandchildren, 37 great-grandchildren, and four great-great grandchildren. Sellwood's interests included playing the piano accordion, keyboard, watching football (particularly the Cats) and being with his family.

Footnotes

References

External links

 Joe Sellwood, at Boyles Football Photos.
 

1911 births
2007 deaths
VFL/AFL players born outside Australia
Australian rules footballers from Victoria (Australia)
Geelong Football Club players
Geelong Football Club Premiership players
Geelong West Football Club players
New Zealand emigrants to Australia
New Zealand players of Australian rules football
One-time VFL/AFL Premiership players